Maruk may refer to:

Dennis Maruk, American ice hockey player
Maruk, Isfahan, a village in Iran
Maruk, Lorestan, a village in Iran
Maruk, South Khorasan, a village in Iran